BBC Radio 1's Live Lounge: The Collection is a compilation album consisting of live tracks played on Clara Amfo's BBC Radio 1 show, both cover versions and original songs. The album was released on 8 November 2019, and is the fifteenth in the series of Live Lounge albums. It debuted on the iTunes UK chart at #8 and hit #4.

Track listing

References 

2019 compilation albums
2019 live albums
Live Lounge
Covers albums
Rhino Entertainment compilation albums
Sony Music compilation albums
Universal Music Group compilation albums
Universal Music TV albums